The New World Tapestry was for a time the largest stitched embroidery in the world. It depicts English colonisation in North America, Guyanas, and Bermuda between the years 1583 and 1642, when the English Civil War began.

Work began on the tapestry in 1980 and continued for twenty years. The tapestry was at the British Empire & Commonwealth Museum until its closure in 2013. It is now in the collection of the Bristol City Museum and Art Gallery in storage.

The panels
The New World Tapestry, which in its entirety measures , consists of twenty-four panels, each of which depicts the narrative of a particular phase in the period between 1583 and 1642.

Each panel measures .

The creation of the tapestry
The designer was Tom Mor, who also designed the Plymouth Tapestry at Prysten House, Plymouth, the Adventurers for Virginia (London) Tapestry, and was the consultant on the Jersey Liberation Tapestry (St Helier, Channel Islands) and the Plympton Tapestry (Plympton, Devon). The panel was researched by Tom Mor, Tom Maddock, Paul Presswell and Freda Simpson. Chief tapissiers were Joan Roncarelli and Renée Harvey. A New World Tapestry Website has been developed as of December 2008 and will soon include 120 pages, showing all complete panels.

Research for the New World Tapestry's twenty-four panels began in 1980. Tom Mor was joined by Tom Maddock, a retired friend from Ivybridge. Over the months they travelled hundreds of miles together, researching the two hundred sixty four people who would be named on the tapestry. Heraldic expert Paul Presswell of Buckfastleigh identified all the coats of arms of the people, colleges and companies involved. The result has been the creation alongside the tapestry of a library of files on each person and a collection of reference books of great use to researchers, scholars and teachers.

Two hundred sixty four armorial shields run along the top and bottom tapestry borders throughout its length, alternating with illustrations of the same number of flowers of herbs, medicinal plants, trees and shrubs. The latter are shown because the colonists took ointments and cure-alls with them on their voyages and plant hunters returned with such things as the potato and tobacco.

All the flowers and florets depicted were drawn from nature by Tom Mor, who studied them under a watchmaker's glass. He was helped from the very early days by Freda Simpson of Plymouth, who was passionately interested in herbs and old herbal remedies. She identified and gave him over 230 flower specimens in the years that Mor lived with his wife and family in Plymouth. Later they moved to Cambridge where he was able to complete the set of 264 drawings with the help of Clive King and Caroline Lawes of the Cambridge University Botanic Garden, Lady Jane Renfrew of Lucy Cavendish College and Alison Davies, Monica Stokes and Edna Norman.

The stitchers
Tom Mor could not have seen his canvasses brought to life without the help of his friends and the expertise of the dedicated tapissiers. When the very first stitch was made in the New World Tapestry in 1980, the team working in Prysten House numbered twenty. By the time the last stitch was made in March 2000, the number of tapissiers had increased to two hundred fifty-six with the addition of another eight centres. In Devon there was a second in Plymouth at HMS Drake (the Royal Navy's panel), Ivybridge, Chillington, Exeter, Bideford, Totnes and Tiverton Castle. Dorset's Tapestry centre was in the Guildhall at Lyme Regis and it was there that the Great Gardeners and Herbalists panel was stitched.

The first oblique Gobelin stitch was made on 26 September 1980 in Prysten House in Plymouth, by U.S. Ambassador the Hon. Kingman Brewster. The coat of arms of His Excellency's ancestor, Pilgrim leader William Brewster, appears on the 1620 Mayflower Panel.

The last oblique Gobelin stitch was made by The Prince of Wales on 3 March 2000 in the Orchard Room of his home at Highgrove House in Gloucestershire. Most fittingly, with his interest in history and a keen gardener himself, the Prince put his golden wool stitch in the date of the 1642 Great Gardeners and Herbalists' Panel.

Stitches have also been added by The Queen, Queen Elizabeth The Queen Mother, The Duke of Edinburgh, The Princess Royal and The Duchess of Gloucester.

Racism controversy
In 2017, representatives of the National Congress of American Indians, who had previously been unaware of the tapestry project, issued statements to the effect that the final product was racist in its depiction of Native American people.   "It shamelessly perpetuates a centuries-long artistic tradition that seeks to portray Native people as subhuman, warlike savages", according to Jacqueline Pata, the executive director of National Congress of American Indians.

"What I wanted to avoid was the picture of English people coming ashore from their galleon to the New World as peaceful and quiet. It wasn’t so," Mor told The Telegraph. "It's no use pretending about it or being shocked by it. Mine is a cartoon, but it is a reality. I tell it as it is and I tell it with humour."

The Library
The New World Tapestry Library material includes histories of the years 1583–1642, much of it original research, files on the two hundred sixty four people named on the tapestry, plus heraldic information on over three hundred individuals, companies, towns, counties and universities.

Supporters
Supporters of the New World Tapestry include the Adventurers for Virginia patrons of the New World Tapestry and Library. Their names are inscribed for posterity in the Adventurers for Virginia Record Book. Supporters who join the Adventurers for Virginia may also:

 In London, celebrate the Adventurers for Virginia Day every 10 April to commemorate the granting of royal charters by James II of England to the London Company and the Plymouth Adventurers (Plymouth Company) in 1606 to establish colonies in Virginia
 Help fund the production of the book, The Jamestown, Sagadahoc and Bermuda Story, for schools and researchers.
 Help fund the production of the Yeardley/Flowerdew Brasses for presentation in England and America.
 Help make grants to the British Empire & Commonwealth Museum at Bristol Temple Meads railway station in Bristol to create the permanent exhibition of the New World Tapestry, expand and enhance the New World Tapestry Library and help the development of three-way educational research between England, the Americas and Bermuda.
 Receive a tie showing the Adventurers' badge plus a lifetime pass to view the tapestry at the museum in Bristol.

References

1980 works
Modern tapestries
Embroidery
Culture of the Americas
Arts in the United Kingdom
Embroidery in the United Kingdom
English colonization of the Americas